Peak Place is an unincorporated community and census-designated place in Santa Fe County, New Mexico, United States. Its population was 377 as of the 2010 census.

Geography

Demographics

Education
Almost all of Peak Place is within Pojoaque Valley Public Schools while a small section is in Santa Fe Public Schools. Pojoaque Valley High School is the zoned school for Pojoaque Valley.

References

Census-designated places in New Mexico
Census-designated places in Santa Fe County, New Mexico